Satu is an album by  Finnish avant-garde jazz composer, bandleader and drummer Edward Vesala recorded in 1976 and released on the ECM label in 1977.

Reception
The Allmusic review awarded the album 2 stars.

Track listing
All compositions by Edward Vesala except where noted.
 "Satu" - 14:37   
 "Ballade For San" - 6:10   
 "Star Flight" - 5:42   
 "Komba" - 6:07   
 "Together" (Edward Vesala, Tomasz Stańko) - 7:06  
Recorded at Talent Studios in Oslo, Norway in October 1976

Personnel
Edward Vesala - drums
Tomasz Stańko - trumpet 
Juhani Aaltonen - soprano saxophone, tenor saxophone, flute, alto flute
Tomasz Szukalski - soprano saxophone, tenor saxophone
Knut Riisnæs - flute, tenor saxophone
Palle Mikkelborg - flugelhorn, trumpet
Torbjørn Sunde - trombone
Rolf Malm - bass clarinet
Terje Rypdal - guitar  
Palle Danielsson - bass
(not credited - strings)

References

ECM Records albums
Edward Vesala albums
1977 albums
Albums produced by Manfred Eicher